Sallani Yapu (Aymara salla rocks, cliffs, -ni a suffix, yapu field,  "field with rocks") is a  mountain in the Andes of Bolivia. It is located in the Oruro Department, Ladislao Cabrera Province, Salinas de Garci Mendoza Municipality. It lies north of the Uyuni salt flat.

References 

Mountains of Oruro Department